Rupert Henry Arnold  (1 February 1904 – 10 June 1974) served as a member of Victoria Police for 41 years and was appointed Chief Commissioner of Victoria Police serving from 1963 to 1969.

Chief Commissioner of Victoria Police 
During Arnold's time with Victoria Police, much change occurred with the mass uptake of motor vehicles. This meant that much of the police's resources shifted to dealing with traffic matters, monitoring roads, issuing licenses, and issuing vehicle registration.

References

Further reading
 
 
 

1904 births
1974 deaths
Chief Commissioners of Victoria Police
Australian recipients of the Queen's Police Medal
Justices of the peace
Commanders of the Order of the British Empire
People from Melbourne